The Visitors Chapel AME is a historic church building at 319 Church Street in Hot Springs, Arkansas.  It is a Three story brick building, designed in a distinctive combination of Classical and Gothic Revival styles by J.H. Northington and built in 1913.  The church has a Greek cruciform plan with a dome at the center, with a Classical gable-front flanked by towers with Gothic windows.  An African Methodist Episcopal congregation is believed to have existed in Hot Springs since the 1870s; this building is the fourth it is known to have built.  It is named in honor of the many outsiders who come to worship with the regular congregants.

The building was listing on the National Register of Historic Places in 1995.

See also
National Register of Historic Places listings in Garland County, Arkansas

References

Churches on the National Register of Historic Places in Arkansas
Neoclassical architecture in Arkansas
Gothic Revival architecture in Arkansas
Churches completed in 1913
National Register of Historic Places in Hot Springs, Arkansas
Individually listed contributing properties to historic districts on the National Register in Arkansas
1913 establishments in Arkansas
African Methodist Episcopal churches in Arkansas
Neoclassical church buildings in the United States